Maryann Ridini Spencer is screenwriter, journalist, TV Host, TV & Film producer/director, author, and member of both the Writers Guild of America, West and the Producers Guild of America. Spencer graduated with a degree in communications from Hofstra University in Hempstead, New York, where she served as co-program director of the college station and worked as a teaching apprentice in the university's TV Production studios.

Work in Theatre 

Spencer began her career in the performing arts at 12, working in her local community theatre in Syosset, New York. At the age of 16 she secured a position as an acting apprentice with The Hampton Playhouse in Hampton, New Hampshire. She also performed and worked as an acting apprentice at The New London Barn Playhouse in New London, New Hampshire. She later won special commendations for her acting, placing in the top level of The New York City and Staten Island Dramatic Invitationals.

Work in Public Relations & Marketing 

Spencer worked as Senior Vice President of Publicity, Advertising & Promotions at Stephen J. Cannell Productions, supervising publicity and marketing initiatives for The Cannell Studios' facilities in Los Angeles and Vancouver. While at the studio she worked on campaigns for such series as: "Hunter," "Wiseguy", "21 Jump Street," and "Sonny Spoon." Before that, Maryann worked as Director of Publicity for Miss Universe, Inc., supervising the national and international publicity for the "Miss Universe", "Miss USA" and "Miss Teen USA" Pageants.  Working at a number of high-profile PR agencies, she also supervised campaigns for such series as:  "Star Trek: The Next Generation" (Paramount), "American Gladiators" (Samuel Goldwyn Company) "Wheel of Fortune" (Merv Griffin Enterprises) and many others.

Ridini Entertainment Corporation 

In 1990 Spencer founded Ridini Entertainment Corporation (REC), a public relations, marketing, website/blog design and TV & Film Production company. REC handled public relations and marketing campaigns for top brands including The United States Olympic Committee, NBC/Universal, E! Entertainment Television and Concorde-New Horizons, Corp. (New Concorde).

TV/Film Writer & Producer 

Under REC's banner, Spencer has served in various producer capacities on a number of television and film projects for the Showtime Networks, USA Networks, SyFy Channel, Movie Channel, and foreign theatrical. In 2011, Spencer co-wrote and produced "The Lost Valentine" starring Betty White and Jennifer Love Hewitt.  The project was a collaborative effort between Hallmark Hall of Fame Productions in association with Paulist Productions, Atchity Entertainment International and Ridini Entertainment Corporation.  Spencer originally optioned the novel, "The Last Valentine" from novelist James Michael Pratt. The film, which aired on January 30, 2011, on CBS-TV, received critical acclaim and was Hallmark Hall of Fame's most highly rated movie in four years, winning the night for CBS with over 14.6 million viewers tuning in.

TV/Print Journalist & TV Host 
Spencer worked as a freelance journalist throughout her career, writing for publications such as Palm Springs Life, Desert Magazine, and Totally Local VC, among others. From 2010-2018, she had a weekly print and video column with the Ventura County Star titled "Simply Delicious.". She also hosts and produces the cooking/lifestyle TV series "Simply Delicious Living with Maryann" seen on PBS-TV in Southern California, The Roku Channel, First Run TV Syndication and ifood.tv.

Cookbook Author & Novelist 
Spencer published the cookbook "Simply Delicious Living with Maryann - Entrees" via Santa Rosa Press, a publishing company operated alongside Ridini Entertainment, in 2013. Her first novel "Lady in the Window" received the 2017 Best Book Award for Fiction: Romance, as well as the 2018 American Fiction Award for Visionary Fiction. Her sequel novel, "The Paradise Table: a Kate Grace Mystery," was published by Santa Rosa Press on October 22, 2019. The third book in the Kate Grace Mysteries, "Secrets of Grace Manor," placed as a finalist in the category Fiction: Inspirational at the 2021 Best Book Awards.

References

External links 
 Maryann Ridini Spencer Official Website
 YouTube Interview
 TV Guide, Tonight's TV Hot List
 Ridini Entertainment Corporation Official Website
 Maryann Ridini Spencer at the Internet Movie Database

American screenwriters
American television producers
American women television producers
Hofstra University alumni
American film producers
Living people
Year of birth missing (living people)